The Islamic Council of Herat is a political body in Herat Province, Afghanistan, which consists of scholars, religious figures, independent civic foundations and non-government bodies.  It is a loose conglomeration created to voice concerns, particularly security issues, which they feel the provincial government is not adequately addressing.

References

Politics of Afghanistan
Herat Province